Tyler "Chip" McDaniel (born October 12, 1995) is an American professional golfer. 

McDaniel played college golf at the University of Kentucky, winning three events. He also won the Kentucky State Amateur in 2013 and 2017 and the Junior PGA Championship in 2013.

McDaniel turned professional in 2018 after graduating. He qualified for the 2019 U.S. Open by finishing first in sectional qualifying. At the U.S. Open, he made the cut and finished 78th.

Amateur wins
2011 Evitt Foundation RTC Junior All-Star
2012 Kearney Hill Golf Links
2013 PGA Junior Series Kearney Hill, Kentucky State Amateur, Junior PGA Championship
2014 Quail Valley Collegiate Invitational
2015 The Grove Intercollegiate
2017 Kentucky State Amateur, Bearcat Invitational

Source:

Professional wins
2018 Governor's Open

Results in major championships

CUT = missed the half-way cut

References

External links
 
 

American male golfers
Kentucky Wildcats men's golfers
Golfers from Kentucky
People from Manchester, Kentucky
1995 births
Living people